Abisoye Fagade is a Nigerian marketing communication professional. He is the founder and managing director of Sodium Brand Solutions.

Career

In 2015 he announced a strategic partnership with Ayeni Adekunle.

In 2019 he founded the Abisoye Fagade Foundation to empower Nigerian youth through mentorship and skills transfer.

A consortium that produces marketing communications, media, consumer goods, hospitality, oil and gas.

Early life
Abisoye Fagade was born on 10 March 1974 in Ibadan, Nigeria.  He attended Queen of Apostle Primary school Oluyoro, Ibadan 1985 and Lagelu Grammar School, Agugu, Ibadan.  In 1991, he studied demography and social statistics at Obafemi Awolowo University and graduated in 1998.

References

Date of birth missing (living people)
Living people
1974 births
Place of birth missing (living people)
Nigerian marketing people
Nigerian company founders
People from Ibadan
Obafemi Awolowo University alumni
Businesspeople from Ibadan
Lagelu Grammar School alumni